Dendya clathrata is a species of calcareous sponge in the family Dendyidae.

References

Clathrinidae